The 62nd annual Venice International Film Festival opened on 31 August 2005 with Tsui Hark's Seven Swords and closed on 10 September 2005 with a screening of Peter Ho-sun Chan's musical Perhaps Love. The lineups were announced by the festival director Marco Müller on 28 July 2005 in Rome. The digital films can compete in all categories for the first time of the festival history.

Asian filmmaking confirmed its vitality, and with this year's most important works demonstrated that it had once again been capable of challenging the most intelligent spectacular effects from Hollywood. 

Japanese animated filmmaker Hayao Miyazaki and Italian actress Stefania Sandrelli were each awarded a Golden Lion for Lifetime Achievement. The Golden Lion was won by Brokeback Mountain.

During this edition of the festival, an International Design Competition of the new Palazzo del Cinema took place. The winner of the competition was 5+1 & Rudy Ricciotti. The purpose of the new building is to house the main headquarters of the Film Festival, as well as congresses and cultural events.

Juries
The international juries of the 62nd Venice International Film Festival were composed as follows:

Main Competition (Venezia 62)
This jury confers the Golden Lion for the best film.
 Dante Ferretti Italian production designer, art director and costume designer (Jury President)
 Ah Cheng, Chinese author and screenwriter
 Claire Denis, French director and writer
 Edgar Reitz, German filmmaker and Professor of Film
 Emilíana Torrini, Icelandic singer, songwriter and actress
 Christine Vachon, American producer active in independent film sector
 Amos Gitai, Israeli filmmaker

Horizons (Orizzonti)
This jury assigns two Horizons Awards, for best film and for best documentary.
 Mimmo Rotella, Italian artist, closely related to cinema (Chairman)
 Isabel Coixet, Spanish director
 Jean-Michel Frodon, French film critic
 Valerio Mastandrea, Italian film, stage and TV actor
 Shinya Tsukamoto, Japanese director and actor

Short Film Competition (Corto Cortissimo)
This jury assigns the Corto Cortissimo Award for best short and the UIP Prize for best European short.
 Chema Prado, Spanish film critic (Chairman)
 Giovanna Gagliardo, Italian director and screenwriter
 Clemens Klopfenstein, Swiss film director

Opera Prima ("Luigi de Laurentiis" Award for a Debut Film)
In a contest that examines all feature-length films that are first works present in the various sections of the Festival, this jury assigns the "Lion of the Future - Luigi De Laurentiis award for best debut work" to one film, as well as a prize of Euro 100,000 put forward by Filmauro and of 20,000 metres of film stock offered by Kodak.
 Guy Maddin, Canadian screenwriter, director, author, cinematographer and editor (Chairman)
 Peter Cowie, British film historian and author
 Isabella Ferrari, Italian film, stage and TV actress
 Ismaël Ferroukhi, French-Moroccan film director
 Renata Litvinova, Russian actress, director and screenwriter

Official selection

In competition
The competitive section of the official selection is an international competition of feature films in 35mm and digital HD format, running for the Golden Lion.

Highlighted title indicates the Golden Lion winner.

Out of competition
Non-competitive section of highly spectacular films. Works by directors already established in past editions of the Festival, and films deemed appropriate for a midnight screening.

Horizons
A section aiming to provide a picture of the new trends in cinema. Documentaries are now included in this section, in order to render the programme more legible and avoid any confusion between different rich and complex sections.

Highlighted titles indicate the Horizons Awards for Best Film and Best Documentary respectively.

Short film competition
The following films in 35mm, whose length does not exceed 30 minutes, were selected for the short film competition (Corto Cortissimo):

Highlighted title indicates Lion for Best Short Film

The Secret History of Asian Cinema
This is a retrospective section on  Chinese cinema (1934 to 1990) and Japanese cinema (1926 to 1978). The films are listed here in chronological order.

The Secret History of Italian Cinema 2
A retrospective section on Italian film (1946 to 1976). This section is part of a planned 4-year retrospective on some lesser known sides of Italian Cinema that started on the 61st edition of the festival.

{| class="wikitable" style="width:95%; margin-bottom:0px"
|-
! English title
! Original title
! Year
! Director(s)
|-
! colspan=4|Casanova on the screen
|-
| The Mysterious Rider (aka) || Il cavaliere misterioso || 1948 || Riccardo Freda
|-
| The Sins of Casanova (aka) || Le avventure di Giacomo Casanova || 1955 || Steno (restored version)
|-
| Giacomo Casanova: Childhood and Adolescence || Infanzia, vocazioni, prime esperienze di Giacomo Casanova, veneziano || 1969 || Luigi Comencini
|-
| Fellini's Casanova || Il Casanova di Federico Fellini || 1976 || Federico Fellini (restored version)
|-
! colspan=4| Homage to Fulvio Lucisano|-
| Planet of the Vampires || Terrore nello spazio || 1965 || Mario Bava (restored version)
|-
| Dr. Goldfoot and the Girl Bombs || Le spie vengono dal semifreddo || 1966 || Mario Bava (restored version)
|-
| What Have You Done to Solange? || Cosa avete fatto a Solange? || 1972 || Massimo Dallamano (restored version)
|-
| The Cursed Medallion || Il medaglione insanguinato || 1975 || Massimo Dallamano (restored version)
|-
|  || Un mondo perfetto (an anthology of film) || 1946–1957 || Nino Pagot, Gibba
|-
! colspan=4| Pier Paolo Pasolini (1922–1975)
|-
| Salò, or the 120 Days of Sodom || Salò o le 120 giornate di Sodoma || 1975 || Pier Paolo Pasolini (restored version)
|-
| Bandits of Orgosolo || Banditi a Orgosolo || 1961 || Vittorio De Seta (restored version)
|}

Autonomous sections
Venice International Film Critics' Week
The following feature films were selected to be screened as In Competition for the 20th Venice International Film Critics’ Week:

* In collaboration with Venice Days

Venice Days
The following films were selected for the 2nd edition of Venice Days (Giornate Degli Autori) autonomous section:

Highlighted title indicates the Lion Of The Future winner. - * In collaboration with the 20th International Critics' Week.

Awards
Official selection
The following Official Awards were conferred at the 62nd edition:

 Golden Lion: Brokeback Mountain by Ang Lee
 Silver Lion for Best Director: Regular Lovers (Les Amants Réguliers) by Philippe Garrel
 Grand Special Jury Prize: Mary by Abel Ferrara
 Volpi Cup for Best Actor: David Strathairn for Good Night, and Good Luck
 Volpi Cup for Best Actress: Giovanna Mezzogiorno for The Beast in the Heart
 Marcello Mastroianni Award (for the best emerging actor or actress): Ménothy Cesar for Heading South
 Award for Best Cinematography: William Lubtchansky for Regular Lovers
 Award for Best Screenplay: George Clooney and Grant Heslov for Good Night, and Good LuckSpecial Awards Special Lion for Overall Work: Isabelle HuppertHorizons awards (Premi Orizzonti) Best Film: First on the Moon (Pervye na lune) by Aleksei Fedorchenko
 Best Documentary: East of Paradise by Lech KowalskiShort Film awards (Corto Cortissimo Lion) Citroen Short Super-Short Lion for Best Short Film: Small Station (Xiaozhan) by Lin Chien-ping
 Special Mention: Layla Afel by Leon Prudovsky
 UIP Prize for Best European Short Film: Butterflies by Max Jacoby

Autonomous sections
The following official and collateral awards were conferred to films of the autonomous sections:Venice International Film Critics' Week Audience Award: Mother Nature (Mater natura) by Massimo Andrei
 Isvema Award: Mother Nature by Massimo Andrei
 FEDIC Award: Mother Nature by Massimo AndreiVenice Days (Giornate Degli Autori) Lion Of The Future''' 
 "Luigi de Laurentiis" Award For A Debut Film: 13 Tzameti by Gela Babluani
 Netpac Award: 13 Tzameti by Gela Babluani
 UNESCO Award: La passione di Giosué l'Ebreo by Pasquale Scimeca
 Pasinetti Awards (Venice Days): Elio Petri. Notes on a Filmmaker by Federico Bacci, Stefano Leone, Nicola Guarneri
 Label Europa Cinemas: The Young Lieutenant (Le petit lieutenant) by Xavier Beauvois
 "Lino Miccichè" First Feature Award: Craj - Domani (documentary) by Davide Marengo
 Venice Authors Prize: Love by Vladan Nikolic

Other collateral awards
The following collateral awards were conferred to films of the official selection:

 FIPRESCI Award
Best Film (Main competition): Good Night, and Good Luck by George Clooney
Best Film (Horizons): The Wild Blue Yonder by Werner Herzog
 SIGNIS Award: Mary by Abel Ferrara
 C.I.C.A.E. Award: Dam Street (Hing yan) by Li Yu (Horizons)
 UNICEF Award: The Beast in the Heart (La bestia nel cuore) by Cristina Comencini
 Pasinetti Awards:
Best film (Main competition): Good Night, and Good Luck by George Clooney
Best film (Horizons): Texas by Fausto Paravidino
 Little Golden Lion: Lady Vengeance (Chinjeolhan geumjassi) by Park Chan-wook
 Jameson Short Film Award: Aria by Claudio Noce
 Young Cinema Award: 
Alternatives: Lady Vengeance by Park Chan-wook
Best International Film: The Constant Gardener by Fernando Meirelles
Best Italian Film: The Beast in the Heart by Cristina Comencini
 Wella Prize: The Beast in the Heart by Cristina Comencini
 Open Prize: Everlasting Regret (Cháng Hèn Gē) by Stanley Kwan
 Doc/It Award (ex-aequo): East of Paradise by Lech Kowalski (Horizons)The Dignity of the Nobodies (La Dignidad de los Nadies) by Fernando E. Solanas (Horizons)
 Lina Mangiacapre Award: The Secret Life of Words by Isabel Coixet (Horizons)
 Future Film Festival Digital Award: Corpse Bride by  Tim Burton and Mike Johnson (Out of competition)
 Laterna Magica Prize: Everything Is Illuminated by Liev Schreiber (Horizons)
 Sergio Trasatti Award: Mary by Abel Ferrara
 Biografilm Award: Everything Is Illuminated by Liev Schreiber (Horizons)
 'CinemAvvenire' Award: 
Best Film in Competition: Lady Vengeance by Chan-wook Park
Cinema for Peace: Heading South by Laurent Cantet
 Award of the City of Rome (ex-aequo):The Beast in the Heart by Cristina ComenciniThe Dignity of the Nobodies by Fernando E. Solanas (Horizons)
 Human Rights Film Network Award: The Dignity of the Nobodies by Fernando E. Solanas (Horizons)
Special mention: Good Night, and Good Luck by George Clooney
 EIUC Award: Giulio Manfredonia, Giobbe Covatta
 Mimmo Rotella Foundation Award: Mary'' by Abel Ferrara

References

External links

Official website
Venice Film Festival 2005 Awards on IMDb
Festival report by Klaus Eder of FIPRESCI

62
Venice
Venice
Venice
Film
August 2005 events in Europe
September 2005 events in Europe